Saraydüzü Dam is a dam in Sinop Province, Turkey, built between 1994 and 2001. The development was backed by the Turkish State Hydraulic Works.

See also
List of dams and reservoirs in Turkey

References
DSI directory, State Hydraulic Works (Turkey), Retrieved December 16, 2009

Dams in Sinop Province